Odd Olai Aalen (born 6 May 1947, in Oslo) is a Norwegian statistician and a professor at the Department of Biostatistics at the Institute of Basic Medical Sciences at the University of Oslo.

Life
Aalen completed his examen artium in 1966 at Oslo Cathedral School before studying first mathematics and physics and then statistics in which he graduated at the University of Oslo in 1972.

Work
His research work is geared towards applications in biosciences. Aalen's early work on counting processes and martingales, starting with his 1976 Ph.D. thesis at the University of California, Berkeley, has had profound influence in biostatistics. Inferences for fundamental quantities associated with cumulative hazard rates, in survival analysis and models for analysis of event histories, are typically based on the Nelson–Aalen estimator or appropriate related statistics. The Nelson–Aalen estimator is related to the Kaplan-Meier estimator and generalisations thereof.

Aalen is currently professor emeritus at the Oslo Centre for Biostatistics and Epidemiology at the Faculty of Medicine at the University of Oslo.

Honors and awards
He is an elected member of the Norwegian Academy of Science and Letters.

References

External links 
 
 The BMMS Centre
 Aalen's home page

1947 births
Living people
Members of the Norwegian Academy of Science and Letters
Norwegian statisticians
Academic staff of the University of Oslo
University of California, Berkeley alumni
University of Oslo alumni
People educated at Oslo Cathedral School
Norwegian expatriates in the United States
Fellows of the American Statistical Association